Veprecula crystallina is a species of sea snail, a marine gastropod mollusk in the family Raphitomidae.

Description
The length of the shell varies between 6 mm and 9 mm.

Distribution
This marine species occurs off the Philippines

References

 Stahlschmidt P., Chino M. & Kilburn R.N. (2012) Two new Veprecula species (Gastropoda: Raphitomidae) from the Philippines. Miscellanea Malacologica 5(6): 99-103.

External links
 Gastropods.com: Veprecula crystallina
 MNHN, Paris: holotype

crystallina
Gastropods described in 2012